Blind Heart or variants may refer to:

Books
Confession, or, The Blind Heart : a domestic story, by William Gilmore Simms  1856
The Blind Heart, by Storm Jameson 1964
The Blindness of the Heart, by Julia Franck 2009

Theatre, Film and TV
The Blind Heart (El Corazón Ciego) comedy by Gregorio Martínez Sierra which inaugurated the Lope de Vega Theatre (Seville) 1929 
Sliepo srdce (The Blind Heart), play for children by Rajmund Kupareo 1944
Blind Heart, film with José Alonso (actor) 2002
My Blind Heart (German: Mein blindes Herz),  Austrian film
Blind Hearts, 1921 American silent drama film produced by Hobart Bosworth who stars along with Madge Bellamy and Raymond McKee

Music
Blind Heart (EP) by American Christian Punk band Poured Out
"Blind Heart", single by Swedish-based DJ-duo Cazzette with Terri Bjerre from List of number-one dance singles of 2015 (U.S.)  2015
"Blind Hearts", single by Twist of Shadows
"Blind Hearts", single by Anka Wolbert 1987